Saud Juma Al-Zaabi (born 7 August 1988) is an Emirati middle-distance runner. He competed at the 2016 Summer Olympics and the 2017 World Championships without advancing from the first round. He never competed at a major international competition before the Rio Olympics.

International competitions

References

1988 births
Living people
Emirati male middle-distance runners
Olympic athletes of the United Arab Emirates
Athletes (track and field) at the 2016 Summer Olympics
Athletes (track and field) at the 2018 Asian Games
Place of birth missing (living people)
World Athletics Championships athletes for the United Arab Emirates
Asian Games competitors for the United Arab Emirates